Chinnodu is a 2006 Indian Telugu-language film directed by Kanmani. It stars Sumanth and Charmy Kaur in the lead roles while Rahul Dev, Chandra Mohan, Rajiv Kanakala, and Brahmanandam play supporting roles. It was remade in Dhallywood as Nishpap Munna and in Kannada as Hara.

Plot 
Chinna is born in jail to a mother who dies during childbirth. The jailer Pashupati feels sorry for Chinna and adopts him. He brings up Chinna along with his son Sanjay and daughter. However, Pashupati's father never acknowledges Chinna since he was born to a prisoner. In an ensuing episode, Chinna kills Pashupati's brother and is jailed. Upon release, Pashupati and his family tell Chinna to stay away from them. Chinna moves into a rough neighborhood that happens to be under the control of the local mafia. He overpowers the mafia and becomes a protector for the local people, while trying to make amends with his foster family. Despite Chinna's efforts, they mistreat him as he's a criminal, with the exception of Pashupati's wife, who is kind to Chinna for some reason. Anjali, a clerk in the police commissioner's office, enters as a co-tenant into Chinna's house. She falls in love with Chinna. However, she mistakenly assumes that Chinna is a soft-natured guy and is unaware of his reputation and murderous past. Their relationship breaks when Anjali finally discovers the truth about Chinna. In the end, it was revealed that Pasupathi's wife accidentally killed Pashupathi's brother and Chinna took the blame to protect her. After learning this truth, Pasupathi's family apologized to Chinna for mistreating him and welcome him back into the family, reuniting him with Anjali as well.

Cast

Production 
After directing a sensible film with Naa Oopiri, Kanmani directed a mass film.

Soundtrack
The music was composed by Ramana Gogula and released by Aditya Music.

Reception 
A critic from Rediff.com rated the film  out of 5 and wrote that "Chinnodu is for those who like action, but it is Sumanth who steals the show". Jeevi of Idlebrain.com called the film "average".

References

External links

2000s Telugu-language films
2006 action films
2006 films
Indian action films
Telugu films remade in other languages